The Independent Art Fair was established in New York City in 2010 by gallerist Elizabeth Dee as a means of challenging the typical format of art fairs. It is typically held during Armory Week in March, and more than one third of its exhibitors come from outside the United States.

The fair has been held in venues across the city, including Spring Studios in 2019.
The 2021 edition will mark the reopening of the Battery Maritime Building in Lower Manhattan.

References

External links

Festivals in New York City
Recurring events established in 2010
Art fairs
Festivals established in 2010
Art festivals in the United States